Plexiform fibrohistiocytic tumor is a rare tumor that arises primarily on the upper extremities of children and young adults.

See also
Sarcoma

References

Dermal and subcutaneous growths